Dmitry Zelenin may refer to:
Dmitry Zelenin (ethnographer), Russian ethnographer
Dmitry Vadimovich Zelenin, Russian politician